George Guest (1924–2002), was a Welsh organist and choral conductor.

George Guest may also refer to:

George Guest (English organist) (1771–1831), English organist and composer

See also
George Gist, Cherokee silversmith